Anthonie van Borssom (2 January 1631 in Amsterdam – 19 March 1677 in Amsterdam) was a Dutch Golden Age landscape painter.

Biography
According to the Netherlands Institute for Art History (RKD), he was an Italianate landscape painter who copied the works of popular landscape painters of his day in Amsterdam such as Jacob van Ruisdael, Paulus Potter, Aelbert Cuyp (church interiors), Nicolaes Berchem, Philips Koninck, Jan Wijnants, Aert van der Neer (moonlit landscapes), Marseus van Schrieck and Cornelis Vroom. He lived and worked in Amsterdam, but made a trip in 1650-1655 along the Rhine and spent time in Kleve. He was buried in the Westerkerk. He was probably a pupil of Rembrandt in the years 1645-1650.

References

External links
 Anthonie van Borssom at PubHist

1631 births
1677 deaths
Dutch Golden Age painters
Dutch male painters
Painters from Amsterdam
Pupils of Rembrandt